Scarecorn Creek is a stream in the U.S. state of Georgia. It is a tributary to Talking Rock Creek.

According to tradition, Scarecorn Creek was named from a farmer's unsuccessful attempt to scare away birds from his crops; the farmer may have scared the corn, but not the birds.

References

Rivers of Georgia (U.S. state)
Rivers of Pickens County, Georgia